Dr Mark Andrew Brazil (born 8 June 1955) is a conservationist, author and journalist, particularly noted for his work on east Asian birds.

Brazil was born in Worcestershire, England, and studied at Keele University, Staffordshire where he graduated with a double honours BA degree in Biology & English Literature in 1977. In 1981 he received his Ph.D. from Stirling University, Scotland for his thesis The behavioural ecology of the Whooper Swan. He worked for many years with Japanese natural history television (NHK Science) and then Television New Zealand (TVNZ) and Natural History New Zealand (NHNZ). He has also worked for various other television companies, including the BBC and BBC Radio, as a scientific advisor, contributor and interviewee. From 1998 to 2007 he was professor of Biodiversity and Conservation at Rakuno Gakuen University, Hokkaido. Since 2007 he has been a freelance natural history and travel writer, an editor of scientific papers, and a frequent leader of expeditions in Japan and internationally.

He was previously scientific advisor/researcher for Natural History Television New Zealand; currently: author, editor, lecturer and expedition leader for Zegrahm Expeditions and Expedition Easy. Previously a resident of Ebetsu, since April 2018 he has been based in the Teshikaga area of east Hokkaido, in the buffer zone of the Akan-Mashu National Park.

Brazil was the author of the "Wild Watch" column for The Japan Times newspaper from April 1982 to March 2015, the longest running single-author natural history column in any newspaper. He has been writer in residence for JapanVisitor.com since June 2011.

Publications
Books
1987: A Birdwatcher's Guide to Japan, Kodansha America 
1991: The Birds of Japan, Christopher Helm Publishers Ltd 
2000: Wild Asia: Spirit of a Continent, Pelican Publishing 
2003: The Whooper Swan, 
2009: Birds of East Asia, Helm Field Guides series, A&C Black 
2013: The Nature of Japan: From Dancing Cranes to Flying Fish, Japan Nature Guides.
2015: Pocket Guide to the Common and Iconic Birds of Japan, Japan Nature Guides.
2015: Pocket Guide to the Common and Iconic Mammals of Japan, Japan Nature Guides.
2018: Birds of Japan, Helm Field Guides series, A&C Black

Has also published numerous papers, magazine and newspaper articles in the fields of science, natural history and travel.

See also
 Wild Bird Society of Japan

References
Review of Field Guide to the Birds of East Asia by Jesper Hornskov in Birdwatch, 01 Jan 2010, accessed 28 December 2010

External links
The Whooper Swan by Mark Brazil as an eBook download, accessed 25 March 2017
JapanVisitor, Japan guide website with articles contributed by Mark Brazil, accessed 25 March 2017
Japan Times Wild Watch column, accessed 25 March 2017

English environmentalists
English ornithologists
Living people
1955 births
Alumni of Keele University
British expatriates in Japan